The 1977–78 FIBA European Cup Winners' Cup was the twelfth edition of FIBA's 2nd-tier level European-wide professional club basketball competition, contested between national domestic cup champions, running from 19 October 1977, to 29 March 1978. It was contested by 22 teams, three less than in the previous edition.

Gabetti Cantù defeated Sinudyne Bologna in a final, held in Milan, winning the FIBA European Cup Winner's Cup for the second consecutive time in the club's history.

Participants

First round

|}

Second round

|}

Automatically qualified to the Quarter finals group stage
 Gabetti Cantù (title holder)

Quarterfinals

Semifinals

|}

Final
March 29, PalaLido, Milan

|}

References

External links 
FIBA European Cup Winner's Cup 1977–78 linguasport.com
FIBA European Cup Winner's Cup 1977–78

Cup
FIBA Saporta Cup